The Girls of Ryanair was a calendar made by low-cost airline Ryanair using female cabin crew as models. The calendar raises money for charity work. The 2009 calendar raised money for homeless charity Dublin Simon Community and it drew seven hundred contenders to appear in it. The 2010 calendar gave the proceeds to KIDS (a charity for disabled children and their families). and it drew over eight hundred of Ryanair's 4,000 female crew employees to appear.

The calendar was discontinued in 2014.

Criticism 
The National Women's Council of Ireland (NWCI) has strongly criticized the calendar.

In December 2013, an advertising campaign for the calendar was prohibited by Spain following complaints.

References

External links 
 Official page 

Calendars
Ryanair